Balestan (also Romanized as Bālestān) is a Kurdish village in Dul Rural District, in the Central District of Urmia County, West Azerbaijan Province, Iran. At the 2006 census, its population was 973, in 248 families.

References 

Populated places in Urmia County